The Werewolves of Millers Hollow is a card game created by the French authors Philippe des Pallières and Hervé Marly that can be played with 8 to 47 players. The game is based on the Russian game Mafia. It was nominated for the 2003 Spiel des Jahres award.

Gameplay 
Before the game starts, a person will be designated as the game master. That person then randomly gives each player a card, after which each player secretly discovers their identity by looking at the card.

All players are divided into two teams: the townsfolk (some of them having special roles) and the werewolves. The townsfolk's aim is to uncover and eliminate all werewolves, while the werewolves' aim is to stay unmasked and eliminate all townspeople.

The game follows a day-night cycle and is structured as follows:
During the night, all players close their eyes and any form of communication is prohibited. When called by the game master, the werewolves wake up and, via gestures, designate a townsperson to be their victim. Townspeople with special roles will also be called out in order to use their respective abilities.
Once the day comes back, all players reopen their eyes and the game master reveals the identity of the victims, said victims being not allowed to further participate in the game but being able to keep their eyes open and spectate. The townspeople try to unmask the werewolves, while the werewolves must avoid being uncovered by redirecting the suspicions onto someone else.

Once the debate ends, each player points at the person they think is a werewolf. The player with the majority of the votes is then "executed", and the game master reveals their identity. Said player is then eliminated, and the game resumes on the arrival of the night.

During the first day, an additional action may be done before designating the werewolf: it's namely voting for the village's Sheriff. Anyone can present themselves, and the Sheriff is nominated by majority vote. Their power can stack on top of their eventual additional skills, and they are very important: in fact, the vote of the Sheriff counts as two. Should the Sheriff be eliminated, they designate their successor.

The game ends when there are only townspeople or only werewolves left.

References 

Board games
Werewolf games